Jennifer Diane Lewis (born January 8, 1976) is an American singer-songwriter, musician, and actress. She was the lead singer, rhythm guitarist, and keyboardist for the indie rock band Rilo Kiley.

Lewis gained prominence in the 1980s as a child actress, appearing in the films Troop Beverly Hills (1989) and The Wizard (1989) and the television series Brooklyn Bridge (1991–93). In the mid-1990s, Lewis semi-retired from acting to focus on her musical career, and formed Rilo Kiley in 1998 with fellow former child actor Blake Sennett. Rilo Kiley released four albums before they disbanded in 2014. Lewis has released four solo albums: Rabbit Fur Coat (2006), Acid Tongue (2008), The Voyager (2014) and On the Line (2019). In addition to Rilo Kiley and her solo career, Lewis has been a member of the Postal Service, Jenny & Johnny, and Nice as Fuck.

Early life
Lewis was born in Las Vegas. Her mother, Linda, was a professional singer, and her father, Eddie Gordon, was a member of the Harmonica Gang. Lewis is of Ashkenazi Jewish descent.

Acting career
Lewis made her professional debut in a Jell-O commercial. She later appeared in commercials for Mattel's Barbie and Baby Skates dolls, Toys "R" Us toy stores, the Black & Decker Popcorn Maker, and Kellogg's Corn Pops, among others. She was featured in the short-lived 1986 Lucille Ball sitcom Life With Lucy, where she was cast as one of Lucy's grandchildren. She also had small roles on TV shows, such as Murder, She Wrote, The New Twilight Zone, Baywatch, The Golden Girls, Growing Pains, Just the Ten of Us, Roseanne, Mr. Belvedere, and Brooklyn Bridge. She appeared on a kids' week episode of the game show Card Sharks on August 6, 1987, at age 11, winning $500, but she did not win her match.

Lewis appeared in over a dozen teen movies, such as Troop Beverly Hills and  The Wizard in 1989. She was featured in the 1996 made-for-TV movie Talk to Me with Yasmine Bleeth, as well as the films Foxfire, Big Girls Don't Cry... They Get Even, and Pleasantville. She played the part of Evangeline "Eva" Saint Claire in the 1987 film version of Harriet Beecher Stowe's novel Uncle Tom's Cabin, and also appeared in the 1988 made-for-TV film A Friendship in Vienna, set in Vienna at the start of the Holocaust. She played Beverly D'Angelo's daughter in the 1996 made-for-TV film Sweet Temptation. She continued acting until 1998, although her final movie – Don's Plum, filmed 1995–96 – went unreleased until 2001. In 2015, she appeared in the Netflix movie A Very Murray Christmas as a waitress and sang a few songs, including "Baby, It's Cold Outside" with Bill Murray.

Music

Rilo Kiley 
In 1998, Lewis and friends Pierre De Reeder, Dave Rock, and then-boyfriend Blake Sennett formed the band Rilo Kiley. (Rock was eventually replaced by Jason Boesel.) In an interview with NPR's All Songs Considered, Lewis remarked that she wanted to name the group Love's Way (after her parents' lounge act in Las Vegas), but Sennett "didn't go for it." Originally asked to sing back-up vocals by Sennett, Lewis refused to join the band unless she was able to sing lead vocals.

Beginning with a country sound, Rilo Kiley gravitated toward a downbeat indie rock sound, gaining the attention of Warner Bros., who signed the band (via its own imprint, Brute/Beaute Records) for the release of their 2004 album More Adventurous, which gained the band some success. Critics such as Pitchfork attributed this to the "wise" decision to emphasize Lewis's voice and presence more so than in previous albums. The song "Portions for Foxes" was a hit. Rilo Kiley's 2007 album Under the Blacklight was released directly by Warner Bros.

In 2011, Sennett hinted that Rilo Kiley had disbanded. Lewis confirmed the band's split in 2014.

A retrospective of Lewis's career by Jessica Roy in 2016 commented that Lewis was a style icon to music-loving young people in the 2000s. Roy commented:

For a particular brand of suburban girl who fancied herself cooler than her peers, Jenny was a fire-haired figure of worship. With her endless supply of cool sunglasses, vintage dresses, and hats ... she was a beacon of hope for introspective teens ... as a microgenerational sad-girl touchstone, many of us have our own Jenny Lewis Anecdote, our lives touched by her magnificent tweeness in different ways.

Solo career

In 2004, Conor Oberst invited Lewis to record a solo record for record label Team Love. Described by Lewis as "a kind of soul record", Rabbit Fur Coat (released January 24, 2006) features contributions from Oberst, M. Ward, and Maroon 5 guitarist James Valentine. Ben Gibbard of Death Cab for Cutie guests on a cover of The Traveling Wilburys' "Handle With Care." The Watson Twins provide accompaniment on the album, billed as Jenny Lewis with the Watson Twins. Lewis toured with the Watson Twins in support of the album three times in 2006 and appeared with her band on the Late Show with David Letterman, The Late Late Show with Craig Ferguson, Late Night with Conan O'Brien and Later with Jools Holland. They also appeared on a Washington, D.C.-based children's music program called Pancake Mountain, performing the song "See Fernando". The album received positive reviews, with Entertainment Weekly writing, "Consider Lewis the Emmylou Harris of the Silverlake set" and Rolling Stone commenting that "her girlishly seductive vocals are more versatile than ever". The A.V. Club, Spin, and NPR music critic Meredith Ochs named it among the best albums of the year.

In 2008, Lewis released a second solo album, this time without the Watson Twins, titled Acid Tongue.

On July 29, 2014, Lewis released The Voyager. The album took five years to complete and is a reflection on Rilo Kiley's break-up and the death of her father. The release of the album was preceded by the single "Just One of the Guys". The music video for "Just One of the Guys" was released on July 15, 2014, through GQ and stars Lewis, Anne Hathaway, Kristen Stewart, Brie Larson, and Tennessee Thomas, former drummer of The Like (now disbanded). Lewis also directed the music video.

On January 23, 2019, Lewis announced the release date of her new album On the Line would be March 22, 2019. The lead single "Red Bull & Hennessy" debuted with positive acclaim.

Jenny and Johnny
In 2010, Lewis formed the duo Jenny and Johnny with her then-boyfriend, musician Johnathan Rice, and the pair released an album titled I'm Having Fun Now on Warner Bros. Records. In 2015, Rice and Lewis wrote the song "Cold One" for the film Ricki and the Flash.

The Voyager Tour

On July 8, 2014, Lewis began her "The Voyager" tour at the Ottawa Bluesfest in Ontario, Canada. She spent July touring the United States and released the album The Voyager on July 29. Her tour included performances at Newport Folk Festival, Lollapalooza, Outside Lands Music and Arts Festival, the Red Rocks Amphitheatre, the 2014 ITunes Festival in London, two performances at the Austin City Limits Music Festival, and the Life Is Beautiful Festival in Las Vegas.

Other projects
In 2002, Lewis was asked to contribute vocals for the band The Postal Service. Lewis performed in the video for "We Will Become Silhouettes", and toured with the band in 2013.

In 2003, Lewis contributed vocals to several tracks on the Cursive album The Ugly Organ.

In 2005, Lewis contributed to the UNICEF benefit song "Do They Know It's Hallowe'en?", along with Sennett and Jimmy Tamborello.

In 2006, Lewis made a cameo in Episode 25, Season 1 of Bob Dylan's Theme Time Radio Hour, and six of her songs (three with the Watson Twins and three with Rilo Kiley) were featured in various episodes of the show.

In 2007, Lewis contributed vocals to various songs on Johnathan Rice's album Further North, and she appeared in the music video for "We're All Stuck Out In The Desert (And We're Gonna Die)". She provided vocals for a track on Dntel's Dumb Luck LP.

In 2008, Lewis contributed backing vocals to several songs on the Elvis Costello and the Imposters album Momofuku.

Later that year, Lewis voiced the role of the assistant director for Walt Disney Pictures' animated film Bolt (2008), and she also provided the song "Barking at the Moon."

In March and April 2009, Lewis traveled to Australia for the first time, as an act for the V Festival, as well as a supporting act for Snow Patrol and performing one solo Sydney show.

On April 18, 2009, Lewis performed at the Coachella Valley Music and Arts Festival in Indio, California.

On May 5, 2009, Lewis performed on The Late Late Show with Craig Ferguson

Lewis makes an appearance on the track "Hard Enough", taken from the 2010 album Flamingo by fellow Las Vegan Brandon Flowers.

In 2013, Lewis created the music score for Tribeca Film's feature Very Good Girls. She provided original music and also included older music from her previous band, Rilo Kiley, such as the song, "Go Ahead".

In 2014, Lewis contributed an exclusive track to HBO's Girls, in collaboration with Vampire Weekend's Rostam Batmanglij titled "Completely Not Me". The song was featured in the Season 3 premiere "Females Only". The song is the second track on Girls Volume Two: All Adventurous Women Do.

In 2016, Lewis contributed to She & Him's second Christmas album, Christmas Party, appearing on the track "Winter Wonderland".

In 2016, the trio Nice as Fuck, comprising Lewis, Erika Forster (of Au Revoir Simone), and Tennessee Thomas (of The Like), debuted at a Bernie Sanders benefit. The group opened on a number of tour dates for M. Ward.

On June 25, 2019, Lewis performed "Wasted Youth" on The Late Show with Stephen Colbert.

On October 28, 2019, Lewis is featured on the fifth issue of Archie Comics' comic book series Jughead’s Time Police, was released on October 30.

On November 13, 2019, it was announced Lewis would be an opening act for Harry Styles on the North American leg of his 2020 Love On Tour.

Filmography

Discography

Rilo Kiley

Rilo Kiley (1999)
 Take-Offs and Landings (2001)
 The Execution of All Things (2002)
 More Adventurous (2004)
 Under the Blacklight (2007)
 Rkives (2013)

Solo

 Rabbit Fur Coat (2006) (with The Watson Twins)
 Acid Tongue (2008)
 The Voyager (2014)
 On the Line (2019)

Jenny & Johnny
 I'm Having Fun Now (2010)
 Live at Third Man Records (2010)

Nice as Fuck
 Nice as Fuck (2016)

Other appearances
 Bright Eyes – Lifted or The Story is in the Soil, Keep Your Ear to the Ground (2002, Saddle Creek)
 Cursive – The Ugly Organ (2003, Saddle Creek)
 The Postal Service – Give Up (2003, Sub Pop)
 The Good Life – Album of the Year (2004, Saddle Creek)
 The Watson Twins – Southern Manners (2006)
 Dntel – Dumb Luck (2007, Sub Pop)
 Whispertown 2000 – Livin' in a Dream (2007)
 Elvis Costello and the Imposters – Momofuku (2008, Lost Highway Records)
 Whispertown 2000 – Swim (2009)
 Brandon Flowers – "Hard Enough" from Flamingo (2010, Island/Vertigo)
 Wavves – Afraid of Heights (2013)
 EZTV – Calling Out (2016)
 She & Him – Christmas Party (2016)
 Paul Shaffer – Paul Shaffer & The World's Most Dangerous Band (2017)
 King Tuff – The Other (2018)
 Vampire Weekend – "2021" (2019)
 The Cactus Blossoms — "Everybody" (2022)

Videography
 Rilo Kiley – "The Frug" (1999, directed by Morgan J. Freeman)
 Rilo Kiley – "Wires and Waves" (filmed 2001/released 2007, directed by Morgan J. Freeman)
 Rilo Kiley - "Bulletproof" (2001, directed by Liam Lynch)
 The Postal Service – "The District Sleeps Alone Tonight" (2003) (Backing Vocals)
 Rilo Kiley – "Portions for Foxes" (2004, directed by Brian Lazzaro)
 Rilo Kiley – "It's a Hit" (2005, directed by Andrew Bruntel, Matt Enlow)
 The Postal Service – "We Will Become Silhouettes" (2005, directed by Jared Hess)
 Jenny Lewis with the Watson Twins – "Rise Up with Fists!!" (2006, directed by Autumn de Wilde)
 Rilo Kiley – "The Moneymaker" (2007, directed by Autumn de Wilde)
 Rilo Kiley – "Silver Lining" (2007, directed by Autumn de Wilde)
 Jenny Lewis – "Black Sand" (2009, directed by Justin Mitchell)
 Jenny Lewis – "See Fernando" (2009, directed by Alan Tanner)
 Jenny Lewis – "Carpetbaggers" (2009, directed by Justin Mitchell)
 Jenny and Johnny – "Big Wave" (2011, directed by Autumn de Wilde)
 The Postal Service – "A Tattered Line of String" (2013, directed by AB/CD/CD) (Backing Vocals)
 Rilo Kiley – "Let Me Back In" (2013, directed by Rilo Kiley)
 Rilo Kiley – "Emotional" (2013, directed by Austin Nagler)
 Jenny Lewis – "Just One Of The Guys" (2014, directed by Jenny Lewis)
 Jenny Lewis – "She's Not Me" (2015, directed by Jenny Lewis)
 Nice as Fuck – "Door" (2016, directed by Jenny Lewis)
 Nice as Fuck – "Guns" (2016, directed by Luke Rathborne)
 Jenny Lewis – "Red Bull & Hennessy" (2019, directed by Eric Notarnicola)
 Jenny Lewis – "Rabbit Hole" (2019, directed by Eric Notarnicola)
 Artists for Peace and Justice: Jonathan Wilson, Jenny Lewis, Sanba Zao, and Jackson Browne – "Lapé, Lanmou (Peace and Love)" (2019, directed by APJ)
 Artists for Peace and Justice: Jenny Lewis with Habib Koité – "Under the Supermoon” (2020, directed by David Belle)
 Jenny Lewis with Serengeti - “Unblu” (2020, directed by Jenny Lewis)
 Jenny Lewis with Serengeti - "Vroom Vroom" (2021, directed by Jenny Lewis)

References

External links

 
 
 Jenny Lewis at NPR Music
 Strangers Almanac column on Glide Magazine
 October 2008 interview on Bob Edwards Weekend 
 "The Magic of the Moment", April 2009 interview in Submerge Magazine
 Listen: Jenny Lewis’ new song “Completely Not Me”, from HBO’s Girls soundtrack by Chris Coplan, Consequence, January 13, 2014. Retrieved January 11, 2022.

1976 births
Actresses from Nevada
American child actresses
American women guitarists
American film actresses
American television actresses
American women rock singers
Jewish American musicians
Living people
Singers from Nevada
People from the Las Vegas Valley
Rilo Kiley members
Rough Trade Records artists
Saddle Creek Records artists
Team Love Records artists
Alternative rock bass guitarists
Alternative rock guitarists
American alternative rock musicians
American rock bass guitarists
Women bass guitarists
20th-century American actresses
21st-century American actresses
The Postal Service members
Jewish rock musicians
Jewish folk singers
Jewish women singers
Guitarists from Nevada
American multi-instrumentalists
Jewish American actresses
21st-century American women singers
21st-century American singers
21st-century American bass guitarists
Third Man Records artists
Nice as Fuck members